Aşık Pasha Mausoleum is a monument as the burial site of the 14th-century Turkish sufi  poet Aşık Pasha (died 1332), located in Kırşehir, Turkey.

References

Mausoleums in Turkey
Buildings and structures in Kırşehir
Buildings and structures completed in the 14th century